Cambodia's Next Top Model, Season 1 is the first installment of an upcoming reality television show hosted by Yok Chenda in which a number of women compete for the title of Cambodia's Next Top Model along with the chance to begin their career in the modeling industry. The other three judges are Kouy Chandanich, Remy Hou, and Chem Vuth Sovin.

The show's first season included 50 semi-finalists, which were revealed on a weekly basis in clusters of five on the show's official Facebook page. The same was done for the revealing of the top 35. Fifteen finalists were selected to move on to the main competition.

Casting calls and auditions were held in Cambodia from May through June 2014. Contestants were required to be between the ages of 18-27, and meet a minimum height requirement of 1.65 meters (5 ft 5 in, excluding the Maltese adaptation of the Top Model franchise, this is the lowest height cut-off in any adaptation). The show began to air on November 14, 2014.

The winner of the competition was 22-year-old Chan Kong Kar from Banteay Meanchey. Apart from winning the title of Cambodia's Next Top Model, she will receive; a talent contract with MYTV, a cash prize of $10,000, the opportunity to appear on the cover of Sovrin Magazine in Cambodia, and a one year membership with The Place Gym in Phnom Penh.

Contestants
(ages stated are at start of contest)

Episodes

Episode 1
Original Airdate: November 14, 2014

Casting episode.

Quit: Pheng Sombath Meas
 Featured photographer: Cheky Athiporn

Episode 2
Original Airdate: November 28, 2014

Quit: Heang Sreypov & Veun Ostin	
Entered: Tang Sovannak Phoung & Trinh Phalla	
First call-out: Moun Mich Samnang 	
Bottom two:  Kheang Kanika & Prem Prey Sovothana	
Eliminated: Kheang Kanika
 Featured photographer: Jack Malipan

Episode 3
Original Airdate: December 5, 2014

First call-out: Meung Sopheak	
Bottom two: Peng Thida & Suon Daroth
Eliminated: Suon Daroth
 Featured photographer: Alex Tee

Episode 4
Original Airdate: December 12, 2014

First call-out: Ke Chankesey	
Quit: Trinh Phalla	 	
Bottom two: Nin Malyneth	& Peng Thida
Originally eliminated: Peng Thida

Episode 5
Original Airdate: December 19, 2014

First call-out: Chan Kong Kar
Bottom two: Peng Thida & Prem Prey Sovothana
Eliminated: Peng Thida
 Featured photographer: Cheky Athiporn

Episode 6
Original Airdate: December 26, 2014

First call-out: Ke Chankesey
Bottom two: Kim Karona & Tang Sovannak Phoung	
Eliminated: Tang Sovannak Phoung
 Featured photographer: Alex Tee

Episode 7
Original Airdate: January 2, 2015

First call-out: Hang Soriyan
Bottom two: Kim Karona & Meung Sopheak
Eliminated: Kim Karona
 Featured photographer: Mars Mario

Episode 8
Original Airdate: January 9, 2015

First call-out: Lun Bodalis
Bottom two: Chan Kong Kar & Prem Prey Sovothana
Eliminated: Prem Prey Sovothana
 Featured photographer: Balazs Maar

Episode 9
Original Airdate: January 16, 2015

First call-out: Lun Bodalis
Bottom two: Nin Malyneth & Srun Kunthy
Eliminated: Srun Kunthy
 Featured photographer: Natacha Van

Episode 10 
Original Airdate: January 23, 2015
First call-out: Hang Soriyan
Bottom two: Meung Sopheak & Moun Mich Samnang 
Eliminated: Moun Mich Samnang
 Featured photographer: Natacha Van

Episode 11
Original Airdate: January 30, 2015
First call-out: Chan Kong Kar
Bottom two: Lun Bodalis & Nin Malyneth
Eliminated: None

Episode 12
Original Airdate: February 6, 2015
First call-out: Chan Kong Kar
Bottom two: Moeung Sopheak & Nin Malyneth
Eliminated: Moeung Sopheak

Episode 13
Original Airdate: February 13, 2015
First call-out: Chan Kong Kar
Bottom two: Lun Bodalis & Nin Malyneth
Eliminated: Nin Malyneth
 Featured photographer: Chem Vuth Sovin

Episode 14
Original Airdate: February 20, 2015
First call-out: Chan Kong Kar
Bottom two: Lun Bodalis & Hang Soriyan
Eliminated: Hang Soriyan

Episode 15
Original Airdate: February 27, 2015

Recap episode.

Episode 16
Original Airdate: March 6, 2015

Interview to look back to the journey of the final three contestants.

Episode 17
Original Airdate: March 27, 2015

Eliminated: Lun Bodalis	
Final two: Chan Kong Kar & Ke Chankesey	 
Cambodia's Next Top Model: Chan Kong Kar

Summaries

Call-out order

 The contestant quit the competition.
 The contestant was eliminated.
 The contestant was the original eliminee but was saved.
 The contestant was part of a non-elimination bottom two.
 The contestant won the competition.

Episode 1 began with 50 contestants. The first preliminary photo shoot determined the top 35 semi-finalists. An interview with the judges saw another 13 girls eliminated. A final photo shoot was used to narrow the pool of 22 to the final 15 contestants. Meas was originally chosen to be a part of the top fifteen, but decided to quit after the finalists had been selected. Due to the number opening, Sopheak was allowed to enter the competition.
 In episode 2, Ostin and Sreypov quit the competition. Phalla and Phoung were brought in as their replacements.
 In episode 4, Phalla quit the competition. As a result, Thida was allowed to remain in the competition.
 In episode 11 Bodalis and Malyneth landed in the bottom two. Neither of them was eliminated.
 Episode 15 was the recap episode.
 Episode 16 was the interview special featuring the contestants who participated during the season. Daroth, Phalla and Karona decided not to take part in this episode.

Photo shoot guide
Episode 1 photo shoot: Modeling Levi's jeans in B&W
Episode 2 photo shoot: Floating in a pool of flowers
Episode 3 photo shoot: Jewelry beauty shots with tarantulas and lizards
Episode 4 photo shoot: Motorcycles on a railroad track
Episode 5 photo shoot: Adidas boxing advertisements
Episode 6 photo shoot: Movement on a trampoline
Episode 7 photo shoot: Fairy tale couture
Episode 8 photo shoot: Covered in paint
Episode 9 photo shoot: Lost in an island with a male model
Episode 10 photo shoot: Lighting candles in a canoe
Episode 11 photo shoot: Pedro handbags over the Cambodian skyline
Episode 12 commercial: Natural republic creamy lipstick
Episode 13 photo shoot: Portraying film actresses
Episode 14 photo shoot: Cambodian goddesses
Episode 17 photo shoots: Sovrin magazine covers; posing live onstage

Judges
 Yok Chenda (Host) 
 Kouy Chandanich (Model)
 Remy Hou (Designer)
 Chem Vuth Sovin (Photographer)

References

External links
Official website

Top Model
2014 Cambodian television seasons
2015 Cambodian television seasons